Kalaç may refer to:

 Kalaç, Çermik, a village in  Diyarbakır Province, Turkey
 Kalaç, Gerede, a village in Bolu Province, Turkey
 Aslı Kalaç (born 1995), Turkish volleyball player

See also